Alfredo Ernesto de Sá Cardoso (6 June 1864 – 24 April 1950), commonly known as Alfredo de Sá Cardoso, or just Sá Cardoso, was a Portuguese republican politician of the Portuguese First Republic who served twice as Prime Minister of Portugal.

Life and politics 
Born in Lisbon, Sá Cardoso was the son of Adelaide Leopoldina de Sá Cardoso. He entered the Colégio Militar and then the Escola do Exército, where his studies focused on artillery. He became an officer of the army and began a decades-long career that would eventually seem him promoted to the rank of general. In 1988, he was mobilized in the Luanda military campaign, occupying the post of secretary of the district government and governor of the fortress of São Paulo de Luanda, and from 1917 to 1918, he was integrated in the Portuguese Expeditionary Corps. He also served as a vogal of the Council for Ballistic Works.

He became a Freemason in 1893, being initiated in the Portugal Lodge with the symbolic name of Alaíde, ascending to the 33rd degree, and being part of its Supreme Council since 1934. 

He was a member of the Portuguese Republican Party, a member of the respective Consultative Junta in 1913, and chief of the party in 1919. He founded the Reconstitution Party with Álvaro de Castro, and served as president of Republican Action, of which he was president. He was an active participant in the republican campaign, since the days of the Portuguese Constitutional Monarchy, taking part in the events of 31 January 1890 and 28 January 1908.

He integrated the Military Committee for the proclamation of the Portuguese Republic and was active in the 1910 revolution. With the republican triumph, he was a cabinet chief of Correia Barreto (1910–1911) and then Civil Governor of the Autonomous District of Funchal 1913–1914. Being a member of the so-called group Jovem Turquia (Young Turkey), he co-organized the 1915 revolutionary movement.

He took part in the resistance against the revolt of Sidónio Pais of 5 December 1917, being imprisoned between 1918 and 1919.  In this last years, faithful to his republican beliefs, he participated in the offensive against the Monarchy of the North.  He served as deputy, for Viana do Castelo, in 1913, 1915, 1919 and 1922, presiding the Chamber of Deputies in the last.

He became Prime Minister of Portugal on 29 June 1919 and served for almost a year until 15 January 1920. On the same day Francisco José Fernandes Costa was taking office, but due to the political instability of the First Republic, he was forced to resign during the same day (his government was called the "Five Minutes' Government"). Sá Cardoso was invited again to form government and he was Prime Minister again from 16 to 21 January 1920, accumulating the Interior (same period) and Foreign Affairs (from 29 June to 12 July 1919). He would participate in another government (of Álvaro de Castro) occupying the post of Minister of Interior between 18 December 1923 and 6 July 1924.

With the 1926 revolution that installed the Ditadura Nacional, a military dictatorial administration that would be followed by António de Oliveira Salazar's authoritarian Estado Novo, Alfredo de Sá Cardoso was again arrested in 1926, and forced to live in a regime of fixed residence, first in Cape Verde and then in the Azores, between 1927 and 1933.

Until the end of his life he refused any political post. He married Gabriela Moreira. He died in Lisbon on 24 April 1950.

References 
 Guinote et al., Ministros e Parlamentares da 1.ª Republica (Ministers and Parliamentarians of the 1st Republic), Assembleia da República (Assembly of the Republic), Lisbon, 1991.

1864 births
1956 deaths
People from Lisbon
Presidents of the Chamber of Deputies of Portugal (1910–1926)
Portuguese Republican Party politicians
Prime Ministers of Portugal
Government ministers of Portugal
Portuguese Freemasons
19th-century Portuguese people